Wydad Athletic Club, a Moroccan professional association football club, has gained entry to all international competitions on several occasions from 1941.

History

CAF competitions

FIFA competitions

UAFA competitions

Arab Club Champions Cup

Arab Super Cup

ULNAF competitions

Statistics

By season
Information correct as of 30 May 2022.
Key

Pld = Played
W = Games won
D = Games drawn
L = Games lost
F = Goals for
A = Goals against
Grp = Group stage

PR = Preliminary round
R1 = First round
R2 = Second round
PO = Play-off round
R16 = Round of 16
QF = Quarter-final
SF = Semi-final

Key to colours and symbols:

By competition

CAF Competitions
:

FIFA competitions
:

UAFA competitions
:

Statistics by country
Statistics correct as of game against Étoile du Sahel on February 29, 2020

CAF competitions

CAF competitions goals
Since 2003 CAF Super Cup as of game against Zamalek on February 7, 2003 except 2004 CAF Confederation Cup
Statistics correct as of game against Étoile du Sahel on February 29, 2020

Hat-tricks

Braces

FIFA Competitions goals

UAFA competitions goals

African opponents by cities

Notes

References

Africa
Wydad AC